This is a partial list of some of the most prominent Righteous Among the Nations per country of origin, recognized by Yad Vashem, the Holocaust Martyrs' and Heroes' Remembrance Authority in Jerusalem. These people risked their lives or their liberty and position to help Jews during The Holocaust; some suffered death as a result. , Yad Vashem has recognized 27,921 Righteous Among the Nations from 51 countries.



By country
These figures are not necessarily an indication of the actual number of Jews saved in each country, but reflect material on rescue operations made available to Yad Vashem as of January 1, 2019.

See also
Individuals and groups assisting Jews during the Holocaust

References

Bibliography
 Those who Helped: Polish Rescuers of Jews During the Holocaust - Publisher: Main Commission for the Investigation of Crimes against the Polish Nation–The Institute of National Memory (1993) 
 Fogelman, Eva. Conscience & Courage: Rescuers of Jews during the Holocaust. New York: Doubleday, 1994.
 Bercher, Elinor J. Schindler's Legacy: True Stories of the List Survivors. New York: Penguin, 1994.
 Michał Grynberg, Księga Sprawiedliwych (Book of the Righteous), Warsaw, PWN, 1993.

External links

Yad Vashem, The Righteous Among The Nations, Virtual Wall of Honor Numbers of Righteous sorted by Country, with links to names. Accessed 6 December 2018.

 
 
Righteous Among the Nations